Olney is a surname. People with the surname include:

 Buster Olney (born 1964), baseball commentator
 Cyrus Olney (1815–1870), American politician and judge
 David Olney (1948–2020), American singer and songwriter
 Frank F. Olney (1851–1903) 18th mayor of Providence, Rhode Island 1894-1896
 Frederick C. Olney (1862–1918), African-American lawyer with Native American ancestry
 Howard Olney (born 1934), Australian jurist and Aboriginal Lands Commissioner
 Ian Olney (born 1969), English association footballer
 Jeremiah Olney (1749–1812), Continental Army soldier and older brother of Stephen Olney 
 John Olney (1932–2015), physician, medical scientist and critic of food additives
 Martha Olney (born 1956), economics professor and textbook author
 Peter B. Olney (1843–1922), New York County District Attorney 1883–1884
 Richard Olney (1835–1917), United States Attorney General and Secretary of State
 Richard Olney II (1871–1939), Congressman from Massachusetts
 Richard Olney (food writer) (1927–1999), American writer
 Sarah Olney (born 1977), British Liberal Democrat politician and an accountant
 Stephen Olney (1755–1832), Continental Army soldier and Rhode Island legislator 
 Violet Olney (1911–1999), British athlete
 Warren Olney (1841–1921), co-founder of the Sierra Club, mayor of Oakland, California
 Warren Olney Jr. (1870–1939), justice of the California Supreme Court
 Warren Olney IV (born 1938), broadcast journalist in Los Angeles, California